Running Wild or Runnin' Wild  may refer to:

Film and television 
 Running Wild (1927 film), a silent film directed by Gregory La Cava and starring W. C. Fields
 Running Wild (1955 film), a crime drama starring William Campbell and Mamie Van Doren
 Running Wild (1973 film), a Western starring Lloyd Bridges
 Running Wild (1995 film), a South African film starring Brooke Shields and Martin Sheen
 Running Wild (1998 film), a family adventure film starring Gregory Harrison and Lori Hallier
 Running Wild (2006 film), a South Korean film
 Running Wild, a 2015 film featuring Jack Quaid
 Running Wild (2017 film), an American film featuring Sharon Stone
 Running Wild (1954 TV series), a 1954 British TV series starring Morecambe and Wise
 Running Wild, a 1987 British sitcom starring Ray Brooks and Michelle Collins
 "Running Wild" (Queen of Swords), an episode of Queen of Swords
 Running Wild with Bear Grylls, a 2014 NBC TV series with Bear Grylls

Music 
 Running Wild (band), a German heavy metal band
 Running Wild (album), a 1985 album by Girlschool
 Runnin' Wild (Tony Rice album), 2001
 Runnin' Wild (Airbourne album), 2007 
 "Runnin' Wild" (Airbourne song), the title song
 "Runnin' Wild" (1922 song), a popular song written by A. H. Gibbs, Joe Grey, and Leo Wood
 "Running Wild", a song by Judas Priest from Killing Machine
 "Running Wild", a song by Roxy Music on the 1980 album Flesh and Blood (Roxy Music album)
 "Runnin' Wild", a song by Soul Assassins from Chapter 1
 "Running Wild", a song by The Soup Dragons from Hotwired
 "Running Wild Blues", a song by Charley Patton
 Runnin' Wild (musical), a 1923 Broadway musical with music by James P. Johnson

Other media 
 Running Wild (novella), a 1988 novella by J. G. Ballard
 Running Wild (video game), a 1998 racing game for the PlayStation
 Running Wild (novel), a 2009 children's book by Michael Morpurgo

See also
 Running Wilde, an American television series